The Toulouse Metro is a rapid transit system serving Toulouse Métropole, France. It is the only Metro system in Occitanie. The city's public transport system was initially managed by the Société d'économie mixte des voyageurs de l'agglomération toulousaine (SEMVAT; literally the Toulouse Passengers' Mixed Economy Company), which was a company 80% owned by local government bodies and 20% privately owned. It has been managed by Tisséo, under the authority of the Syndicat Mixte des Transports en Commun, an authority established by various local government bodies, since 2003.

In 2018, the network was used by 110.3 million passengers. The Toulouse Metro consists of two primarily underground metro lines, Line A and Line B, that together serve 37 stations, comprising  of route. It is supplemented by the Toulouse railway network (including suburban Line C, Line D and Line F) and Toulouse tramway (Line T1 and T2—former Line E) which serves the northwestern suburbs and Toulouse–Blagnac Airport.

History 
 1983: City Council decides to create a metro line on a south-western/north-eastern axis.
 1985: the municipality decides to use VAL technology.
 1987: the project receives planning and environmental approvals.
 1989: beginning of work on Line A.
 1993: opening of Line A.
 1997: beginning of preliminary studies for the extension of Line A and the construction of Line B.
 2001: beginning of work on extension of Line A and construction of Line B.
 December 2003: Opening of the extension of line A to Balma-Gramont.
 30 June 2007: Opening of Line B, (Borderouge - Ramonville).
 2010: Tram Line T1 opens from Arènes to Blagnac
 2013: Opening of the extension of Line T1 to Palais de Justice
 2028: Planned start of operations of the Line C (third metro line)

Network 
The Toulouse Metro is currently composed of two lines:
 Line A, Basso-Cambo - Balma Gramont. Opened in 1993, it is mainly underground, but comprises some elevated sections.
 Line B, Borderouge - Ramonville. On a north–south axis, entirely underground and which opened on 30 June 2007.

Map

Lines

Metro: Line A 

Line A currently comprises 18 stations on a 12.5-kilometre (7.8 mi) route. The original section of Line A opened in June 1993; an extension from Jolimont to Balma-Gramont opened in 2002.  It extends from the shopping centre of Balma through Toulouse with stations at Marengo (connecting with the main SNCF railway station), Capitole, Place Esquirol and University of Mirail. After its final station, Basso-Cambo, is a carriage shed-workshop, which provides storage, maintenance and tests of the rolling stock for the whole of network. The Central Control Centre is also located at the garage-workshop.

Its operating hours are 05:15 AM to midnight (Sunday to Thursday), and until 03:00 AM (Friday and Saturday).

In order to reduce costs, five of the 18 stations have short platforms. Long platforms are needed to use four-carriage trains instead of two in order to double the capacity of the line. As a result, 13 years after its opening the line is saturated - peak hour lasts longer and longer, and the opening of Line B (2007), Line E (2009) and various exclusive bus lanes will bring additional traffic flows on to Line A and suggests that the use of Line A will become increasingly uncomfortable. Short platforms are being lengthened and longer trains are expected to serve the whole line by late 2019.

A  northern extension to L'Union is also under study by the year 2030. The terminus station would be at Plaine des Monges.

Metro: Line B

This line has initially 20 stations  on a  route.  It opened on 30 June 2007.  Car parks have been built at Borderouge, and Ramonville stations. New bus stations have been built Borderouge, Université Paul Sabatier and Ramonville stations.

In January 2006, the Mayor of Toulouse, Jean-Luc Moudenc called for a fast decision on a southern extension of Line B. This extension would include  of line on viaduct, with a crossing of the Canal du Midi and the A61 autoroute, four stations and would terminate at Labège - Innopole. It would cost €330 million and be opened in 2019. This project has been shelved in favor of a third metro line.

Tram: Lines T1 and T2

The Tramway Line T1 runs between Beauzelle and Toulouse-Arènes passing through Blagnac. It was to open in November 2010, but this was delayed by industrial action; instead it opened in December 2010.
The line has 18 stops:
- Arènes (Connection to Metro lines A and C)
- Zénith
- Cartoucherie
- Casselardit
- Purpan
- Arênes Romaines
- Ancely
- Servanty
- Guyenne
- Pasteur
- Relais
- Marronniers
- Patinoire
- Grand Noble
- Georges Brassens
- Lycée
- Beauzelle
- Garossos

Line T2 opened in 2015 as a branch of line T1. Both lines have a common section from southern terminus Palais de Justice to Ancely. Then, line T2 goes toward Toulouse Blagnac airport.

Technology 

Lines A and B are automatic metro lines, which use VAL technology built by Matra, now part of Siemens Transportation Systems.

Platform screen doors separate the platforms from the tracks and are synchronised with the doors of the trains. Therefore, each platform must be absolutely straight. Each two-car set can accommodate from 150 to 220 people.

The trains have rubber tyres and use a third rail 750 V direct current electric supply.

A central control centre regulates the network and ensures its safety and can take control of trains remotely in the event of an incident or a breakdown.

Currently, two types of rolling stock are in circulation: VAL 206 and VAL 208. The name of the next station is announced just before each stop and just after the departure from the preceding station. In VAL 208 trains, the name of the next station and its connections are shown in each car on a panel of LEDs.

Future plans 

Until 2014, extensions to the tram line were planned, to Grand Rond and to Beauzelle. Another tram line would have also been built in time for the arrival of the LGV Bordeaux–Toulouse. The project has been canceled in 2014 due to the change of leadership of the city in favor of the new metro line.

In December 2015, the transport authority SMTC unveiled the outline route for what was then called the Toulouse Aerospace Express, which will be the third metro line in the city. The  20 station line will connect the Colomiers railway station near the Toulouse-Blagnac Airport on the west through city centre before ending at Labège in the southeastern suburb of Toulouse. Further studies and a public inquiry took place to select the final route. The line is expected to cost €1.72bn and finish construction in 2028. The line has been renamed line C in 2022.

See also 
 List of metro systems
 List of Toulouse Metro stations
 Rubber-tyred metro

References

External links 

  
 Toulouse at UrbanRail.net 
 Timeline of the Toulouse (France) Rail Transit Network at CityRailTransit.com 

 
750 V DC railway electrification
Rapid transit in France
Transport in Toulouse
VAL people movers